Eric Forbes-Robertson (1865–1935) was a British figure and landscape painter. He was the brother of two actors Sir Johnston Forbes-Robertson and Norman Forbes-Robertson.

Biography 

Eric trained at the Académie Julian in Paris in the late 1880s. Amongst the other students at that time were Paul Sérusier, Pierre Bonnard, Édouard Vuillard and Maurice Denis.

In August 1890 he travelled to Pont-Aven, Brittany with his friend and fellow student Robert Polhill Bevan. It was there that he met Paul Gauguin and his name is inscribed along with those of Roderic O'Conor and Armand Séguin in Gauguin's portfolio (now in the Metropolitan Museum of Art).

In 1897 Eric married a Polish art student, Janina Flamm, on the island of Jersey. Her bridesmaid was a fellow Pole Stanisława de Karłowska and it was here that the latter met her future husband Robert Polhill Bevan.

Little is known of the Forbes-Robertsons' later work, although both exhibited at the August 1911 show of the Esperantist Vagabond Club.

References
 Bevan, R.A. Robert Bevan 1865-1925. A memoir by his son (London, Studio Vista, 1965).
 Frances Stenlake. Robert Bevan from Gauguin to Camden Town (London, Unicorn Press, 2008).
 John Yeates. NW1, The Camden Town Artists: A social history (Somerset, Heale Gallery, 2007).

External links
In the forest, Pont-Aven (1895 oil on canvas - Tate Gallery)
Trois baigneuses (1897 oil on canvas - Christie's)
Adam and Eve (1895 drawing)

1865 births
1935 deaths
Modern painters
English landscape painters
Artists' Rifles soldiers
Académie Julian alumni